French Style is Dean Martin's first LP for Reprise Records. Recorded during February 1962, it features French-themed popular songs and chansons arranged by Neal Hefti. Among them "C'est si bon," which frequently appears on Dean Martin compilation albums; a rendition of Edith Piaf's classic "La Vie en rose"; the title song from the MGM classic Gigi; and two classic Cole Porter tunes. Originally released as Reprise LP R(S)-6021 ('S' distinguishing the stereo pressing), the album's tracks made their CD debut as part of the chronologically sequenced Bear Family box set Everybody Loves Somebody (BCD 16343). A subsequent two-on-one CD (together with Martin's succeeding album Dino Latino) by Collectors' Choice restored the original running order.

Track listing

References

Dean Martin albums
1962 albums
Reprise Records albums
French-language albums
Concept albums
Albums arranged by Neal Hefti
Albums conducted by Neal Hefti